Karesi is a new intracity district and second level municipality in Balıkesir Province, Turkey. According to Law Act No. 6360, all Turkish provinces with a population more than 750.000, were declared metropolitan municipality. The law also created new districts within the capital city which have second-level municipalities in addition the metropolitan municipality. Karesi is one of them.

Thus after 2014 the present Balıkesir central district was named Karesi and the name Balıkesir was reserved for the metropolitan municipality.  (Karesi was the name of a short-lived -14th-century Turkmen beylik around Balıkesir.)

Rural area

There are 2 towns (Şamlı and Kocaavşar), 28 quarters (1. Oruçgazi, 2. Oruçgazi, 1. Sakarya, 2. Sakarya, Adnan Menderes, Akıncılar, Ali Hikmet Paşa, Atatürk, Aygören, Çay, Dumlupınar, Ege, Eskikuyumcular, Hacıismail, Hisariçi, Karaoğlan, Karesi, Kayabey, Kızpınar, Kuvayi Milliye, Maltepe, Mirzabey, Paşaalanı, Toygar, Üçpınar, Vicdaniye, Yenimahalle, Yıldırım) and 41 villages (Aktarma, Alacabayır, Armutalan, Bakacak, Beyköy, Boğazköy, Büyükpınar, Çanacık, Çaypınar, Davutlar, Deliklitaş, Düzoba, Fethiye, Halkapınar, Hisaralan, İbirler, Kabakdere, Kalaycılar, Kamçıllı, Karabeyler, Karakolköy, Kavaklı, Kırmızılar, Köteyli, Kurtdere, Naipli, Ortaca, Ovacık, Taşkesiği, Tatlıpınar, Toybelen, Turplu, Yağcılar, Yaylabayır, Yaylacık, Yenice, İskender, Yeniköy, Yeroluk, Yeşilova, Ziyaretli) in Karesi district. Now their status became "Neighborhood of Karesi". As of 2013 the population of Karesi was 167.549 and as of 2019, the population is 183.084.

Cityscape
Anafartalar Street, Milli Kuvvetler Street, Vasıf Çınar Street, Kızılay Street, Atalar Street are important streets in the city. Aygören, Karaoğlan, Dumlupınar, Hisariçi, Karesi, Kızpınar, Hacıilbey quarters are the first settlements of the city. The eldest settlements are acclivity, lane and also have adjoint buildings. Many historical places are in these quarters. A summary of new settlements are Atatürk, Paşaalanı and Adnan Menderes quarters. The squares of the city: Ali Hikmet Pasha (AHP), Republica, Wrestler Kurtdereli Mehmed and Karesi.

Trade and economic life is concentrated on three streets. These are Milli Kuvvetler Street,Kızılay Street and Anafartalar Street. Commercial life focuses on these streets and the small streets which are intersecting these streets and avenues. As a part of the city skyline, New Bazaar Area is the oldest shopping place for the city. Vasıf Çınar Street and Gazi Boulevard are other busy areas.

Salih Tozan Cultural Center is important for cultural activities in the city. Public transport area where is the point of transport networks is near the Salih Tozan. Yaylada is one of most important places for citylife.

Main sights
The capital of Balıkesir province contains many historical buildings. The clocktower (built in 1892) is the symbol of the city. A historical fountain (built in 1908) is another popular building. The Zaganos Pasha Mosque Complex and Yildirim Mosque are popular spiritual areas. Many old Balıkesir houses in the Aygören and Karaoğlan district remain from the Ottoman period. The center of the city also contains the historical Turkish "Pasha Hamami" bath, which is still in use.

Balıkesir National Photography Museum is the only photography museum in Turkey. The Museum of National Moment, exhibits historical memories of the city. Of course, Karesi is especially known for its historic windmills.

Zaganos Pasha Mosque: Zaganos Pasha, named after one of the viziers and commanders during the reign of Fatih Sultan Mehmet was built in 1461.
Yildirim Mosque: It's the oldest remaining work from the Ottoman period in Balikesir city. Yildirim Beyazid had it built in 1388 in the second half of the 14th century.
Umurbey Mosque: It has an epitaph of three lines engraved on marble using a special script called Sülüs. The date is 1412.
Clock Tower: Giridizade Mehmet, Pasha of the Governor of Silistre, had it built as a replica of the Galata Tower in İstanbul in 1827, but it collapsed in the earthquake in 1897. Governor Ömer Ali Bey, had the present tower rebuilt.
Karesi Principality Tomb: It was built in 1336. It contains Karasi Beg's and his five children's graves. Karasi Beg's sarcophagus is decorated with Sufic script.
But only three windmills remain. Hunting and tracking are the best sports, accompanied by windmills' views.
Değirmenboğazı: (means Strait of mill) City forest. It is a forest area situated between two hills.  A pleasant picnic place – it contains a tea garden and restaurant.
Balikesir Local-Civil Houses:The city's oldest districts have traditional houses which show the economy and lifestyle of the city until the 1500s.

Local cultural heritages
The main souvenir of city is Eau de Cologne is aromatic lily. Hösmerim which is made from cheese and egg is the popular dessert of this city. Many old Turkish dishes (such as keşkek, güveç, tirit, mantı, kaymaklı) compose the Karesi cuisine.

History
 Karasids

Education
 Balıkesir Lisesi
 Sirri Yircali Anadolu Lisesi

Twin towns – Sister cities
Karesi is twinned with:
 Maçka, Turkey (since 2015)
 Schwäbisch Hall, Germany (since 2006)

Notable natives
 Egemen Korkmaz – National football player
 Fikret Hakan – Actor
 Imam Birgivi – Muslim scholar
 Kadızade Mehmed - Muslim scholar
 Kurtdereli Mehmet Pehlivan – World-famous oilwrestler
 Mehmet Çoban – Olympian Greco-Roman wrestler
 Nazmi Solok – Military officer in the Ottoman and Turkish armies
 Olcan Adın – National football player
 Oğuz Savaş – National Basketball player
 Tamer Yiğit – Actor
 Tülin Altıntaş – National volleyball player
 Zağanos Pasha – Ottoman military commander

References

Districts of Balıkesir Province
Populated places in Balıkesir Province